Naghobilevi is a village in the Ozurgeti Municipality of Guria in western Georgia. Located north of Meria Airport.

References

Populated places in Ozurgeti Municipality